The 2003 Munster Senior Hurling Championship Final was a hurling match played on Sunday 29 June at Semple Stadium in Thurles. It was contested by Cork and Waterford. Cork captained by Alan Browne claimed the title beating Waterford on a scoreline of 3-16 to 3-12.

Waterford was leading by 1-9 to 1-4 at halftime. John Mullane scored three goals in the game for the defending champions, one in the ninth minute of the first half and two in the second half but ended up on the losing side. Paul Flynn was also sent off for Waterford for a second bookable offense deep in injury time.

References

External links
Match Highlights

Munster
Munster Senior Hurling Championship Finals
Cork county hurling team matches
Waterford GAA matches